Trochiloglossa is a genus of parasitic flies in the family Tachinidae. There are at least two described species in Trochiloglossa.

Species
These two species belong to the genus Trochiloglossa:
 Trochiloglossa aurea Thompson, 1963
 Trochiloglossa tropica Townsend, 1919

References

Further reading

 
 
 
 

Tachinidae
Articles created by Qbugbot